"Wild 'N Free" is a country-dance song by the Swedish band Rednex, released as the fourth single from their debut album, Sex & Violins. Its techno-country dance style is built around a re-recorded sample of "The Infernal Galop" from Act II, Scene 2 from Jacques Offenbach's Orpheus in the Underworld. The song appeared in the 2006 Paramount Pictures and Nickelodeon Movies film Barnyard in the scene where the character Wild Mike dances.

Critical reception
James Hyman from British magazine Music Week'''s RM Dance Update commented, "Someone had to give the can-can a stompin' Euro-novelty workout. At least Rednex have done it in style with interesting production and remixes that include the slower Nightcrawlers/Robin-S sounding ones from Rhythm on the Loose." Another editor, James Hamilton described it as a "fiddles scraped and 'French Can Can' whistled corny Village People-ish pop chanter". Chuck Campbell from Scripps Howard News Service'' wrote that "Rednex pull their oddest move with "Wild and Free", a hyper can-can/country/techno/neo-Village People free-for-all."

Music video
The music video for "Wild 'N Free" was directed by Van Der Berg.

Track listings
 "Wild 'N Free" (Original Mix) – 3:39
 "Wild 'N Free" (Remix Edit) – 3:52
 "Wild 'N Free" (Original Extended) – 4:54
 "Wild 'N Free" (Remix Extended) – 4:46

Charts

References

1994 songs
1995 singles
English-language Swedish songs
Rednex songs
Songs written by Anders Hansson (songwriter)
Songs written by Pat Reiniz